Wingo may refer to:

 Barker v. Wingo, a United States Supreme Court case
 Wingo (airline), a low-cost airline based in Colombia, subsidiary of Copa Airline of Panama
 Wingo Anderson (1886–1950), an American baseball pitcher
 Wingo Branch, a stream in Mississippi
 Wingo, California, a ghost town located in Sonoma County, California
 Wingo (Cars), a character in the 2006 animated film Cars
 Wingo, Kentucky, a city in Graves County, Kentucky
 Wingo (saying), a term of excitement used by Dale Gribble in King of the Hill
 Wingo (shooting) a short-lived shotgun shooting sport from the 1970s.
 Wingo (surname)
 Wingo xprs, a small airline company in Finland